Di Tzeitung (the journal, News Report) is a Yiddish weekly newspaper published in New York City, founded and edited by Abraham Friedman, a Satmar Hasidic Jew, from Borough Park, Brooklyn, New York.

It is published weekly, every Wednesday. It is sold throughout New York, especially in the Yiddish-speaking parts of Brooklyn, Williamsburg and Borough Park.

The newspaper's mission is to bring news to the readers with a non-partisan look, and although the editor belongs to the Satmar community and advocates their methods, they do not interfere in its internal disputes. The newspaper's editors identify with a liberal worldview, and tend to the Democratic Party more than other Yiddish newspapers.

History 
The first edition was published on Parshat Acharei Kedoshim 5748 (1988), under the name "Nayes Baricht". For the first three weeks, they asked customers to offer good names to the paper, and the winner would receive an eternal subscription to the paper until it got its current name, "Di Tzeitung".

Controversy 

In 2011, the newspaper got involved in a controversy when Di Tzeitung digitally altered Secretary of State Hillary Clinton and Director for Counterterrorism for the NSC Audrey Tomason out of Situation Room, the iconic photo showing President Obama and his security team watching the raid on Osama bin Laden's compound on May 2, 2011, due to its policy of not running photographs with women because of modesty laws.

The newspaper subsequently apologized for altering the image in breach of the terms of its release, and explained that the editor who made the change had not seen the White House conditions for publication, which stipulated that the photo "may not be manipulated in any way". The newspaper said it has a "long-standing editorial policy" of not publishing women's images. It explained that its readers "believe that women should be appreciated for who they are and what they do, not for what they look like, and the Jewish laws of modesty are an expression of respect for women, not the opposite".

The statement went on to say that while Clinton has served "with great distinction", the newspaper does not publish images of women, as that is not "in accord with our religious beliefs".

The Washington Post subsequently issued a correction, noting that Di Tzeitung had not violated any White House copyright because the photograph was "in the public domain from the moment of inception".  In addition, Dee Voch (The Week), a weekly Hasidic magazine from Brooklyn, also edited out the women.

The editing of images of women out of photographs is a common practice of Haredi newspapers. While some interpreted this practice as a result of inequality to women's rights in Hasidic Judaism, Di Tzeitung, in its statement, said it was done only because of modesty reasons, and should in no way be seen as degrading of women.

References 

Hasidic Judaism in New York City
Jews and Judaism in Brooklyn
Newspapers published in New York City
Yiddish culture in New York City
Yiddish-language newspapers published in the United States